West Renfrewshire was a county constituency of the House of Commons of the Parliament of the United Kingdom from 1885 to 1983 and again from 1997 until 2005. In 2005 the constituency was abolished and the area is now represented by Inverclyde, Paisley and Renfrewshire North and Paisley and Renfrewshire South.

Boundaries 
The Redistribution of Seats Act 1885 provided that the Western division should consist of "the parishes of Inverkip, Greenock, Port Glasgow, Kilmalcolm, Erskine, Inchinnan, Houston, Kilbarchan, Lochwinnoch, Renfrew, Abbey, Neilston, Beith, and Dunlop".

From 1918 the constituency consisted of "The Lower county District, inclusive of all burghs situated therein, except the burgh of Greenock, together with the burgh of Johnstone."

From 1997 to 2005 the constituency consisted of the Renfrew District electoral divisions of Bargarran and Gryffe, and the Inverclyde District electoral division of Port Glasgow and Kilmacolm.

In 1999 with the creation of the devolved Scottish Parliament, a Scottish Parliamentary constituency of West Renfrewshire was created with the same name and boundaries as the UK Parliament constituency.

Abolition
Under the Parliamentary Constituencies (Scotland) Order 1983 (SI 1983/422), made under the authority of the House of Commons (Redistribution of Seats) Act 1949, West Renfrewshire was abolished in 1983. The area of the constituency was divided between Renfrew West and Inverclyde, Paisley North and Paisley South.

In 2005, the constituency was again abolished and remains so to the present day. The Parliamentary Constituencies (Scotland) Order 2005 (SI 2005/250) made under the authority of the Parliamentary Constituencies Act 1986 divided the former West Renfrewshire constituency amongst the new Inverclyde, Paisley and Renfrewshire North and Paisley and Renfrewshire South constituencies.

Members of Parliament

MPs 1885–1983 

Constituency divided amongst:
 Renfrew West and Inverclyde
 Paisley North
 Paisley South

MPs 1997–2005 

Constituency divided amongst:

 Inverclyde
 Paisley and Renfrewshire North
 Paisley and Renfrewshire South

Election results

Elections in the 1880s

Elections in the 1890s

Elections in the 1900s

Elections in the 1910s

General Election 1914–15:

Another General Election was required to take place before the end of 1915. The political parties had been making preparations for an election to take place and by the July 1914, the following candidates had been selected; 
Liberal: James Greig
Unionist: Henry Mechan

Elections in the 1920s

Elections in the 1930s

Elections in the 1940s
General Election 1939–40

Another General Election was required to take place before the end of 1940. The political parties had been making preparations for an election to take place and by the Autumn of 1939, the following candidates had been selected; 
Unionist: Henry Scrymgeour-Wedderburn
Labour: David Cleghorn Thomson
SNP:

Elections in the 1950s

Elections in the 1960s

Elections in the 1970s

Elections in the 1990s

Elections in the 2000s

References 

Historic parliamentary constituencies in Scotland (Westminster)
Constituencies of the Parliament of the United Kingdom disestablished in 1983
Constituencies of the Parliament of the United Kingdom disestablished in 2005
Constituencies of the Parliament of the United Kingdom established in 1885
Constituencies of the Parliament of the United Kingdom established in 1997
Politics of Renfrewshire
Politics of Inverclyde
Port Glasgow